Kerry Christina Tipper (born December 11, 1983) is an American politician and attorney who is a former member of the Colorado House of Representatives from the 28th district in Jefferson County. In May 2022, Denver Mayor Hancock appointed Tipper as Denver Deputy City Attorney.

Political career

Election
Tipper was elected in the general election on November 6, 2018, winning 59 percent of the vote over 38 percent of Republican candidate Kristina Alley. She was elected to her second term on November 3, 2020, winning 58 percent of the vote over 37% of Republican candidate Pete Roybal. In early 2022, Tipper decided not to seek re-election.

Legislation 
Tipper successfully passed over 30 piece of legislation, including HB19-201 Colorado's CANDOR law, HB19-1239 Census Outreach Grant Program, SB19-231 Colorado Second Chance Scholarship, SB20-185 The Colorado Imagination Library Program, HB20-1014 Misuse of Human Reproductive Material ("Fertility Fraud"), HB20-1010 Colorado Accurate Residence for Redistricting Act ("End Prison Gerrymandering Act"), SB21-027 Emergency Supplies for Colorado Babies and Families, SB21-148 Creation of Financial Empowerment Office, HB21-1194 Immigration Legal Defense Fund, HB22-1108 Implementation of Fertility Coverage, HB22-1393 Displaced Aurarian Scholarship, HB22-1317 Restrictive Employment Agreements (Colorado's new non-compete law), HB22-1153 Affirm Parentage Adoption in Assisted Reproduction, and SB22-224 Protections for Donor-conceived Persons and Families.

Personal life
Tipper is the daughter of World War II veteran Edward Tipper, seen in Episodes 1 and 3 of the HBO miniseries Band of Brothers. Her mother is originally from Costa Rica.

References

Tipper, Kerry
Living people
21st-century American politicians
21st-century American women politicians
Women state legislators in Colorado
1983 births